Elli Beny W Benak ("what's between me and you") is the first studio album by Moroccan singer Jannat, released on July 12, 2006, under Egyptian label GoodNews4Music.

Track listing

 While visiting Dubai city, beginning June 2009 to promote her new album Hob Emtelak, Jannat received a EMI Golden Disk Award for her album Elli Beny W Benak.

References

2006 albums
Arabic-language albums